AUF may refer to:

African Unification Front, an organization promoting African unity
Agence universitaire de la Francophonie, the international educational organisation
 AMX-30 AuF1, a French self-propelled howitzer
Angeles University Foundation, a Catholic university in Angeles City, Philippines
 Australian Ultralight Federation, now Recreational Aviation Australia, the Australian governing body for ultra-light aircraft 
Australian Underwater Federation, the peak body in Australia for underwater sports
James Bond 007: Agent Under Fire, a video game
Uruguayan Football Association
Workers' Youth League (Norway),, the Norwegian democratic socialist youth movement
 AuF, gold(I) fluoride
 AUF1 (channel), Austrian far-right media platform
 HNRPD, a protein also known as AUF1